Angulomicrobium tetraedrale is a bacterium from the genus Angulomicrobium.

References

External links
Type strain of Angulomicrobium tetraedrale at BacDive -  the Bacterial Diversity Metadatabase

Hyphomicrobiales
Bacteria described in 1986